Wu Minxia (born 10 November 1985) is a retired Chinese diver, specializing in the 1 metre and 3 metre springboard, and synchronized 3 metre springboard events. Entering her first major championship in 2001, Wu represented China at every Asian Games, Olympic Games and FINA World Aquatics Championships through 2016. She is an eight-time world champion, and a five-time Olympic and Asian champion, making her one of the most decorated divers in history.

Career
Wu began her competitive career at the 2001 World Aquatics Championships, partnering with Guo Jingjing to win the 3 metre women's synchronized springboard. She would go on to retain the title with Guo on another three occasions, missing out in 2005 when Guo partnered with Li Ting to win in Montreal. Wu also won the same event with Guo at the 2002 Asian Games.

Wu represented China at the 2004 Summer Olympics, earning a gold medal in the 3 metre women's synchronized springboard along with Guo Jingjing before winning a silver medal in the 3 metre women's springboard, coming in second place behind Guo. At the 2008 Summer Olympics, Wu earned a gold medal in the 3 metre women's synchronized springboard along with Guo before winning a bronze medal in the 3 metre women's springboard, coming in third place behind Guo and Russian Julia Pakhalina. After Guo's retirement, she participated in synchronized events with He Zi.

The new partnership allowed her to retain the 3 metre synchro title at the 2011 World Aquatics Championships. It was at the same championships in her hometown where she won her only other world championship title, in the 3 metre springboard. At the 2012 Summer Olympics, Wu earned a gold medal in the 3 metre women's synchronized springboard along with He, becoming the first woman to win gold medal in a diving event in three consecutive Olympic Games. She also won a gold medal in the 3 metre springboard event. After the 3 metre springboard competition, it was revealed that her parents withheld information that her grandmother died a year before, and that her mother had cancer. Her father said he misled her to keep her focused on training. The news drew criticism in China.

By winning the 3m synchronized springboard event at the 2013 and 2015 World Championships with new partner Shi Tingmao, Wu became the first person to win seven gold medals in the event. At the 2014 Asian Games and the 2016 Summer Olympics, Wu earned a gold medal in the 3 metre women's synchronized springboard along with Shi.

Personal life
On 12 May 2017, Wu accepted a marriage proposal by boyfriend Zhang Xiaocheng. The couple were married on 17 May, with the wedding ceremony being held in Fuping, Shaanxi. Their daughter was born on 19 December 2018, and son was born on 7 February 2022.

See also
List of multiple Olympic gold medalists

References

1985 births
Living people
Chinese female divers
Divers at the 2004 Summer Olympics
Divers at the 2008 Summer Olympics
Divers at the 2012 Summer Olympics
Divers at the 2016 Summer Olympics
Olympic divers of China
Olympic bronze medalists for China
Olympic gold medalists for China
Olympic silver medalists for China
Divers from Shanghai
Olympic medalists in diving
Asian Games medalists in diving
Divers at the 2002 Asian Games
Divers at the 2006 Asian Games
Divers at the 2010 Asian Games
Divers at the 2014 Asian Games
Medalists at the 2016 Summer Olympics
Medalists at the 2012 Summer Olympics
Medalists at the 2008 Summer Olympics
Medalists at the 2004 Summer Olympics
World Aquatics Championships medalists in diving
Asian Games gold medalists for China
Asian Games silver medalists for China
Medalists at the 2002 Asian Games
Medalists at the 2006 Asian Games
Medalists at the 2010 Asian Games
Medalists at the 2014 Asian Games
Universiade medalists in diving
Universiade gold medalists for China
Medalists at the 2003 Summer Universiade
Medalists at the 2005 Summer Universiade
The Amazing Race contestants
21st-century Chinese women